The 1997–98 Australian Figure Skating Championships was held in North Ryde from 1 through 9 August 1997. Skaters competed in the disciplines of men's singles, ladies' singles, pair skating, and ice dancing across many levels, including senior, junior, novice, adult, and the pre-novice disciplines of primary and intermediate.

Senior results

Men

Ladies

Pairs

Ice dancing

External links
 results

1997 in figure skating
1998 in figure skating
Fig
Fig
Australian Figure Skating Championships
August 1997 sports events in Australia